Battle of Jasmund may refer to:

Battle of Jasmund (1676)
:da:Søslaget ved Jasmund (1715) is the Danish name for Battle of Rügen (1715)
Battle of Jasmund (1864)